Kindleberger is a surname. Notable people with the surname include:

Charles P. Kindleberger (1910–2003), American economic historian and author
Jacob Kindleberger (1875-1947), Founder of Kalamazoo Vegetable Parchment (KVP) Company
Richard Kindleberger (1942–2010), American journalist

See also
42354 Kindleberger, an asteroid